The following lists events that happened during 1963 in South Yemen.

Events

October
 October 14 - A revolution starts in Radfan against British colonial rule.

December
 December 10 - A grenade is thrown at a gathering of British officials at Aden Airport, resulting in a state of emergency being declared in the British Crown colony.

 
Years of the 20th century in South Yemen
1960s in South Yemen
South Yemen
South Yemen